Gloria, officially the Municipality of Gloria,  is a 3rd class municipality in the province of Oriental Mindoro, Philippines. According to the 2020 census, it has a population of 50,496 people.

The town was previously a barangay called Maligaya, the largest barangay during the administration of President Diosdado Macapagal. Local politicians, led by former guerrilla chief Nicolas Jamilla, Sr., battled for the conversion of Maligaya into a new town. They renamed it after the ten-year-old daughter of the President, Gloria Macapagal Arroyo, who later on herself became the fourteenth President in 2001. Jamilla became the first mayor of the town, which kept the old name "Maligaya" as the name of a barangay in the poblacion.

History
Gloria was once part of the municipality of Pinamalayan. In 1915, migrant families from Marinduque settled in Barrio Tambong, and in 1930, when a national road was built through Pinamalayan, they moved west and occupied the area along this road. Tambong was later divided into two barrios: the first retained the original name, while the second was called Maligaya (meaning "happy"), alluding to the settlers' happiness at the bountiful yield of their agricultural crops.

The residents of 25 barrios (Maligaya, Kawit, Malusak, Balite, Dalagan, Tinalunan, Calamundingan, Bulbogan, Langang, Banus, Agus, Batingan, Papandungin, Malamig, Tubag, Malayong, Malubay, Mirayan, Guimbonan, Agsalin, Manguyang, Banutan, Boong-Lupa, Tambong and Maragooc) grouped together and petitioned for the separation of their barrios from the municipality of Pinamalayan. The petition was granted on October 1, 1964, through Executive Order No. 117 issued by President Diosdado Macapagal. Executive Order No. 140, issued on February 25, 1965, by the same President, defined and fixed the boundaries of Gloria as a new municipality. On December 24, 1965, however, the Supreme Court nullified its status as a municipality. Gloria was finally recognized as a distinct municipality on June 9, 1966, when Housebill No. 6107, sponsored by Congressman Luciano Joson, was enacted into law. (It later became known as RA 4651.)

The new municipality was named Gloria, primarily as a token of gratitude to President Macapagal, whose daughter is named Gloria, and secondarily from the word "glory", celebrating the settlers' "glorious" life in Barrio Maligaya.

Barrio Maligaya later became the poblacion and the official seat of the municipal government. Nicolas M. Jamilla Sr. was appointed first Mayor of Gloria by President Diosdado Macapagal, serving from 1964 to 1967. He then ran in the local election of 1967 and won. The first session of the Municipal Council was held in the residence of Mr. Albino Janda. The town's official functions were held in this house from February 1964 to November 1965; then in the residences of Genaro Olavidez from March to June 1965 and Arsenio Arriola from July 1965 to 1973.

The name of the following barangays were changed: Bulbugan to Santa Maria; Dalagan to San Antonio; Malusak to Narra; Batingan to A. Bonifacio; Tubag to Macario Adriatico; Tinalunan to Gaudencio Antonino; Langang to Santa Theresa and Calamundingan to Lucio Laurel. The new barangays of Bulaklakan and Alma Villa were created later. In 1968, Gloria Realty Development Corporation donated two hectares to the municipality, and this became the site of the Municipal Building in 1972. Under the leadership of Mayor Jamilla, the municipality later bought a ten-hectare lot, which became the site of the Municipal Cemetery, Sports Center, Agricultural Center and Breeding Station, and the Medicare Hospital.

Geography

It is one of the 7 towns comprising Oriental Mindoro's second district. On its north lies its mother town Pinamalayan, on the west is the town of Sablayan in Occidental Mindoro. On the south is the town of Bansud, while on the east is the Tablas Strait.

Climate

Barangays
Gloria is divided into 27 barangays: nine (9) barangays are situated along the national highway - Bulaklakan, Maligaya, Kawit, Narra, Balete, Lucio Laurel, G. Antonino, Santa Maria and Banus; six (6) are coastal barangays - Tambong, San Antonio, Santa Theresa, Guimbonan, Maragooc and Agsalin; and twelve (12) interior barangays on the west side - Agos, A. Bonifacio, Alma Villa, Mirayan, Buong Lupa, Malamig, Malubay, M. Adriatico, Papandungin, Malayong, Banutan and Manguyang.

Demographics

Economy

Government

Elected officials
Members of the municipal council (2019-2022):

List of former chief executives
 Nicolas M. Jamilla, Sr. (1964–1986; 1988–1995)+
 Amando Medrano (1986–1987)+
 Felix V. Jarabe (1987)+
 Alonzo San Agustin (1987–1988)+
 Jimmy S. de Castro (1995–2001)
 Romeo D. Alvarez (2001–2010)
 Loreto S. Pérez (2

Culture

Events
 February 14–15: Town fiesta honouring the Sacred Heart of Jesus
 September 29 to October 1: Kawayanan Festival
 October 1: Foundation Day

Education

Tertiary
Erhard Science and Technological Institute
Gloria Institute of Science and Technology

Secondary
President Diosdado Macapagal Memorial National High School (formerly known as Malamig National High School Extension)
Malamig National High School
Manuel Adriano Memorial National High School
Bulbugan National High School
Sacred Heart Academy
Oriental Mindoro Institute
CLJC Center for Excellence and Development Academy

Notable personalities
Zaijian Jaranilla - Filipino actor best known for his role as the orphan Santino in the 2009–2010 ABS-CBN religious-themed teleserye, May Bukas Pa.

References

External links
Gloria Profile at PhilAtlas.com
[ Philippine Standard Geographic Code]
Philippine Census Information
Local Governance Performance Management System 

Municipalities of Oriental Mindoro
Establishments by Philippine executive order